The 2013 Aaron's 312 was the eighth stock car race of the 2013 NASCAR Nationwide Series and the 22nd iteration of the event. The race was held on Saturday, May 4, 2013, in Lincoln, Alabama, at Talladega Superspeedway, a 2.66-mile (4.28 km) permanent triangle-shaped superspeedway. The race was shortened from 117 laps to 110 due to impending darkness. After a wreck-fest race, Regan Smith, driving for JR Motorsports, would win the race under caution, a controversial win as the caution had been called just barely 200 feet from the finish, as if the drivers had been allowed to race back to the line, eventual-third-place finisher, teammate Kasey Kahne, would have won. The win was Smith's second career NASCAR Nationwide Series win and his first win of the season. To fill out the podium, Joey Logano of Penske Racing would finish second.

Background 

Talladega Superspeedway, originally known as Alabama International Motor Superspeedway (AIMS), is a motorsports complex located north of Talladega, Alabama. It is located on the former Anniston Air Force Base in the small city of Lincoln. The track is a tri-oval and was constructed in the 1960s by the International Speedway Corporation, a business controlled by the France family. Talladega is most known for its steep banking and the unique location of the start/finish line that's located just past the exit to pit road. The track currently hosts the NASCAR series such as the NASCAR Cup Series, Xfinity Series and the Gander RV & Outdoors Truck Series. Talladega is the longest NASCAR oval with a length of 2.66-mile-long (4.28 km) tri-oval like the Daytona International Speedway, which also is a 2.5-mile-long (4 km) tri-oval.

Entry list

Practice

First practice 
The first practice session was held on Thursday, May 2, at 3:00 PM CST, and would last for 45 minutes.

Second and final practice 
The second and final practice session, sometimes referred to as Happy Hour, was held on Thursday, May 2, at 4:00 PM CST, and would last for 50 minutes.

Qualifying 
Qualifying was held on Friday, May 3, at 11:10 PM CST. Each driver would have two laps to set a fastest time; the fastest of the two would count as their official qualifying lap.

Pastrana stated, “It sounds like a dream come true. Bringing the guys to the line at the green flag at Talladega is awesome, so I’m definitely excited."

Two drivers would fail to qualify: Stanton Barrett and John Wes Townley, who despite qualifying in tenth, was disallowed after his car was found to be too low.

Full qualifying results

Race 
Pole sitter Travis Pastrana led the first lap of the race. On lap 5, Pastrana and Roush Racing teammate Trevor Bayne decided to swap tandems but fell back as the pack caught up to the 2 cars. Ty Dillon took the lead from Bayne and Pastrana with a push by Kurt Busch. Busch swapped positions with Dillon on the next lap but fell back as Kasey Kahne took the lead after Busch led lap 6. Elliott Sadler took the lead from Kahne on lap 13 and Kahne took it back the next lap. The first caution flew on lap 14 when Danica Patrick crashed in turn 3. Joey Logano won the race off of pit road making him the race leader. Allgaier passed Logano for the lead on lap 19 but soon both began to swap the lead with Logano getting pushed by Sam Hornish Jr. and Allgaier getting pushed by Kurt Busch. Brian Vickers took the lead from Logano on lap 26 but Logano took it back on the next lap of the race. On lap 34, Kasey Kahne passed Logano for the lead but gave it back to Logano on the next lap. On lap 35, the second cautin flew for a 2 car crash in turn 3 involving Kyle Larson and Jeffery Earnhardt. Logano won the race off of pit road keeping his lead. On lap 42, Logano got passed by Elliott Sadler giving Sadler the lead. Logano took it back on lap 44 and led the next 11 laps of the race. On lap 55, Logano and his drafting partner Kasey Kahne switched positions to prevent Kahne from overheating and gave the lead to Elliott Sadler. On lap 57, Brian Scott took the lead from Sadler. On lap 58, Reed Sorenson took the lead followed by Trevor Bayne on lap 59. On lap 60, Kasey Kahne took the lead from Bayne. On lap 63, Regan Smith took the lead and both Smith and Kahne began to swap the lead from each other. With 46 laps to go, the third caution flew when Reed Sorenson got turned by Brian Scott on the backstretch and got ran into by Travis Pastrana lifting Sorenson's rear end into the air. Joey Logano once again won the race off of pit road to keep his lead. The race restarted with 39 to go. With 37 to go, Parker Kligerman took the lead. Both Kligerman and Kurt Busch began to swap the lead from each other before with 31 laps to go, Kasey Kahne took the lead. With 30 to go, Kurt Busch took the lead back from Kahne. On the same lap, Blake Koch got turned by Justin Allgaier and hit the outside wall coming out of turn 2. The race restarted with 27 laps to go and Kurt Busch leading the race. Justin Allgier tried to take the lead but failed and Busch led with 26 to go.

Final laps  
With 26 laps to go in turn 3, the big one struck taking out 11 cars. Sam Hornish Jr. moved down trying to avoid Johanna Long but got turned by Eric McClure and both turned down into Brian Scott and Tim Andrews and the 4 cars spun up the racetrack collecting more cars. The cars involved were Johanna Long, Brian Scott, Trevor Bayne, Robert Richardson Jr., Sam Hornish Jr., Bobby Gerhart, Tim Andrews, Ty Dillon, Eric McClure, Kyle Larson, and Nelson Piquet Jr. During the caution period, NASCAR announced that they were gonna shorten the race to 107 laps due to the darkness that was falling. The race restarted with 7 laps to go on lap 101 with Kurt Busch as the leader. Regan Smith took the lead from Busch on that lap but Busch took it back with 6 laps to go. With 3 laps to go, Austin Dillon took the lead from Busch. But on the same lap, Joey Coulter crashed in the tri-oval bringing out 6th caution and setting up a green-white-checker. On the restart, Dillon took the lead from Busch. On the final lap, Busch took the lead with a push by Justin Allgaier. Joey Logano pulled up to the Busch's outside with a push by Alex Bowman but Logano moved up to block Regan Smith and Smith went to the bottom of the track. Both Smith and Logano went by Busch and Kahne pulled up to the outside of them. Meanwhile, behind the 4 cars, Brian Vickers got turned by Elliott Sadler and collected Alex Bowman, Landon Cassill, Mike Wallace, Jamie Dick, and Josh Wise. Instead of letting them race back since the finish line was about 1,000 feet away, NASCAR threw the caution before they reached the finish line. Kasey Kahne crossed the finish line first but Regan Smith was in front when the caution came out and NASCAR declared him the winner. Joey Logano, Kasey Kahne, Kurt Busch, and Justin Allgaier rounded out the top 5 while Parker Kligerman, Mike Wallace, Jason White, Jeremy Clements, and Austin Dillon rounded out the top 10.

Race results

References 

2013 NASCAR Nationwide Series
NASCAR races at Talladega Superspeedway
May 2013 sports events in the United States
2013 in sports in Alabama